United Nations Security Council Resolution 311, adopted on February 4, 1972, after reaffirming previous resolutions on the topic and noting the continued military build-up by South Africa, the Council condemned the policy of apartheid and recognized the legitimacy of the struggle of the oppressed people of South Africa.

The Council then urgently called upon the government of South Africa to release all persons imprisoned as a result of apartheid and called upon all states to strictly observe the arms embargo.  The Council finished by urging governments and individuals to contribute generously and regularly to UN funds for humanitarian and training purposes for the people of South Africa and decided to examine methods of resolving the present situation.

The resolution was adopted by 14 votes to none; France abstained from voting.

See also
 List of United Nations Security Council Resolutions 301 to 400 (1971–1976)
 South Africa under apartheid

References
Text of the Resolution at undocs.org

External links
 

 0311
 0311
February 1972 events